Sefton is a civil parish and a village in the Metropolitan Borough of Sefton, Merseyside, England.  It contains 19 buildings that are recorded in the National Heritage List for England as designated listed buildings.  Of these, one is  listed at Grade I, the highest of the three grades, and the others are at Grade II, the lowest grade. The parish contains the villages of Sefton and Lunt, and is otherwise rural.  The listed buildings include houses, farmhouses and associated buildings, a church and associated structures, an ancient cross base, a public house, and a war memorial.

Key

Buildings

References

Citations

Sources

Listed buildings in Merseyside
Lists of listed buildings in Merseyside